Guerrilla Warfare is the second studio album by the New Orleans hip-hop group Hot Boys, released on July 27, 1999, on Cash Money Records. It was an instant hit, debuting at #5 on the Billboard 200 and #1 on the Top R&B/Hip Hop Albums selling 142,000 copies in its first week, and remains their most successful album as a group and with Cash Money Records.

Produced by Mannie Fresh, Guerrilla Warfare contains the lead single, "We On Fire", which was placed at #49 on the Billboard's Hot R&B/Hip-Hop Singles. Other charting tracks include "I Need A Hot Girl" which also peaked at #65 on the Billboard Hot 100.

The album was recorded in one week's time at the Circle House recording studio in Miami, according to group member Turk.

Commercial performance
Guerrilla Warfare was certified Platinum by RIAA on November 1, 1999. The album has sold over 1,500,000 copies since its release.

Track listing 

All tracks are produced by Mannie Fresh

Charts

Weekly charts

Year-end charts

See also
 List of number-one R&B albums of 1999 (U.S.)

References 

1999 albums
Hot Boys albums
Cash Money Records albums
Albums produced by Mannie Fresh